Linchester is an unincorporated community in Caroline County, Maryland, United States. The community's name is a portmanteau of Caroline County and that of neighboring Dorchester County.

References

Unincorporated communities in Caroline County, Maryland
Unincorporated communities in Maryland